Lillian Zuckerman (born Lillian Fara Stein, September 16, 1916 – October 11, 2004) was an American actress. She was born in Baltimore, Maryland and died in Miami, Florida.

Filmography

References

External links

1916 births
2004 deaths
Actresses from Baltimore
Deaths from cancer in Florida
20th-century American women
20th-century American people
20th-century American male actors
21st-century American women